Debeljača is a village in Serbia. It is situated in the Kovačica municipality, in the South Banat District, Vojvodina province.

Ethnic groups (2002 census)
The village has a Hungarian ethnic majority and its population numbering 5,325 people (2002 census).

 Hungarians = 2,836 (53.26%)
 Serbs = 1,735 (32.58%)
 Yugoslavs = 196 (3.68%)
 Romani = 170 (3.19%)
 others.

Historical population

1961: 6,789
1971: 6,413
1981: 6,413
1991: 5,734
2002: 5,325
2011: 4,910

See also
List of places in Serbia
List of cities, towns and villages in Vojvodina

References

Slobodan Ćurčić, Broj stanovnika Vojvodine, Novi Sad, 1996.

External links
Torontálvásárhely/Debeljača - official page
History of Debeljača
Torontálvásárhelyi Református Egyházközség

Populated places in South Banat District
Kovačica
Hungarian communities in Serbia